United Nations Security Council resolution 974, adopted unanimously on 30 January 1995, after recalling previous resolutions on Israel and Lebanon including 501 (1982), 508 (1982), 509 (1982) and 520 (1982) as well as studying the report by the Secretary-General Boutros Boutros-Ghali on the United Nations Interim Force in Lebanon (UNIFIL) approved in 426 (1978), the Council decided to extend the mandate of UNIFIL for a further six months until 31 July 1995.

The Council then reemphasised the mandate of the Force and requested the Secretary-General Boutros Boutros-Ghali to continue negotiations with the Government of Lebanon and other parties concerned with regard to the implementation of resolutions 425 (1978) and 426 (1978) and report thereon. His intention to achieve economies in the maintenance and logistical support areas was welcomed.

See also 
 List of United Nations Security Council Resolutions 901 to 1000 (1994–1995)
 South Lebanon conflict (1985–2000)

References

External links
 
Text of the Resolution at undocs.org

 0974
 0974
South Lebanon conflict (1985–2000)
1995 in Israel
1995 in Lebanon
 0974
January 1995 events